The United States Air Force's 40th Air Expeditionary Wing (40 AEW) was an Air expeditionary unit located at Diego Garcia, in the Indian Ocean, from 2002 to c. 2006. The 40 AEW's mission was to support combat forces in Afghanistan and other combat areas supporting Operation Enduring Freedom. Operations began in October 2001.

Its predecessor unit, the United States Army Air Forces 40th Bombardment Group (40th BG) was part of Twentieth Air Force during World War II. The unit served primarily in the Pacific Ocean theater and China Burma India Theater of World War II. The 40th Bomb Group's aircraft engaged in very heavy bombardment B-29 Superfortress operations against Japan. Its aircraft were identified by Triangle "S".

The 40th Bombardment Group was one of the original ten USAAF bombardment groups assigned to Strategic Air Command on 21 March 1946, however it was inactivated due to budget constraints on 1 August 1946. The unit was reactivated and elevated to Wing status in 1952 as a SAC B-47 Stratojet organization until the phaseout of the aircraft in 1964. Reactivated as a USAFE wing to be the host unit at Aviano Air Base, Italy in 1966 to provide support to Tactical Air Command deployed rotational elements until 1992.

Second World War 

The 40th Bombardment Group was constituted in Puerto Rico on 22 November 1940 and activated on 1 April 1941. The unit's operational squadrons (29th, 44th and 45th) were equipped with Douglas B-18 Bolos then early Boeing B-17 Flying Fortresses and Martin B-26 Marauder aircraft to train, and patrol the Caribbean area, later to provide air defense of the Panama Canal after the Japanese attack on Pearl Harbor.

With the diminished need for defenses in the Caribbean, the 40th was reassigned back to the United States and redesignated the 40th Bombardment Group (Very Heavy) in November 1943, being assigned to Pratt Army Airfield, Kansas and to the first B-29 Superfortress wing, the 58th Bombardment Wing. At Pratt, the group's squadrons (25th 44th, 45th, and 395th) began transition training on the new aircraft and its new mission.

In March 1944, the group left the United States and deployed to a former B-24 Liberator airfield at Chakulia, India. In India, the group was assigned to the XX Bombardment Command of the new Twentieth Air Force. During the week of 15–22 April, no less than five 58th Bomb Wing B-29s crashed near Karachi all from overheated engines. The entire Wing had to be grounded en route until the cause was found. Modifications had also to be made to the aircraft and after these modifications, B-29 flights to India were resumed.

From India, the 40th Bomb Group planned to fly missions against Japan from airfields in China. However, all the supplies of fuel, bombs, and spares needed to support the forward bases in China had to be flown in from India over "The Hump" (the name given by Allied pilots to the eastern end of the Himalayan Mountains), since Japanese control of the seas around the Chinese coast made seaborne supply of China impossible. Many of the supplies had to be delivered to China by the B-29s themselves. For this role, they were stripped of nearly all combat equipment and used as flying tankers and each carried seven tons of fuel. The Hump route was so dangerous and difficult that each time a B-29 flew from India to China it was counted as a combat mission,

The first combat mission by the group took place on 5 June 1944 when the group's squadrons took off from India to attack the Makasan railroad yards at Bangkok, Thailand. This involved a 2261-mile round trip, the longest bombing mission yet attempted during the war.

On 15 June the group participated in the first Army Air Forces attack on the Japanese Home Islands since the Doolittle raid in 1942 when it took part in the bombing of Yawata. Operating from bases in India, and at times staging through fields in China, the group struck such targets as transportation centers, naval installations, iron works, and aircraft plants in Burma, Thailand, China, Japan, Indonesia, and Formosa, receiving a Distinguished Unit Citation for bombing iron and steel works at Yawata, Japan, on 20 August 1944. From a staging field in Ceylon, the 40th mined waters near the port of Palembang, Sumatra, in August 1944.

The group was reassigned to Tinian, in the Marianas February–April 1945, for further operations against Japan with the XXI Bomb Command. The 40th made daylight attacks from high altitude on strategic targets, participated in incendiary raids on urban areas, and dropped mines in Japanese shipping lanes. Received a Distinguished Unit Citation for attacking naval aircraft factories at Kure, oil storage facilities at Oshima, and the industrial area of Nagoya, in May 1945. Raided light metal industries in Osaka in July 1945, being awarded another DUC for this mission.

After V-J Day, the group dropped food and supplies to Allied prisoners in Japan, Korea, and Formosa, and took part in show-of-force missions.

Strategic Air Command 

The group returned to the United States in November 1945, being assigned to March Field, California. It was assigned to the Fourth Air Force of Continental Air Forces. Continental Air Forces would later evolve into the Strategic Air Command on 21 March 1946.

The 40th Bombardment Group was one of the ten existing bombardment groups assigned to SAC when it was first formed. The group was relocated to Davis–Monthan Field, Arizona and had the 25th, 44th, 45th, 343d and 395th Bomb Squadrons, equipped with B-29s. Demobilization, however, was in full swing and the group turned in its aircraft and was inactivated on 1 October 1946. Many of the wing's personnel and aircraft were reassigned to the 43d Bombardment Wing, which was reactivated at Davis–Monthan on 1 October 1946 as part of the re-established Eighth Air Force.

The unit was reactivated as the 40th Bombardment Wing, Medium at Smoky Hill Air Force Base, Kansas on 28 May 1952. Although activated, it was not manned until early February 1953, when it gained personnel and equipment from the 40th Tactical and Maintenance Squadron (Provisional) established at Davis–Monthan AFB, Arizona as a holding unit for people and equipment surplus to the 303d Bombardment Wing being formed at Davis–Monthan. Once activated, the wing received control and guidance from the 310th Bombardment Wing at Smoky Hill until 1 May 1953.

The new wing was initially assigned to the 802d Air Division, Fifteenth Air Force. By October 1953, all tactical squadrons were minimally operational. Flew second-line Boeing B-29 Superfortresses in 1953–1954 which had returned from Kadena AB, Okinawa and the Korean War while becoming operational. In 1953, the wing gained KC-97 Stratofreighters and took on a refueling mission.

Replaced the propeller-driven B-29s with new B-47E Stratojet swept-wing bomber medium bombers in 1954, capable of flying at high subsonic speeds and primarily designed for penetrating the airspace of the Soviet Union and became combat ready in April 1955. Reassigned to Eighth Air Force, 802d Air Division on 1 July 1955 after becoming operationally ready with the B-47. It carried out bombardment training and air refueling operations to meet SAC's global commitments. Attached to the 7th Air Division From 9 June to 9 September 1955 while deployed to RAF Lakenheath, England. Deployed to RAF Greenham Common, England July–October 1957.

In 1959, the Department of Defense began a major renovation of Schilling AFB. During the next year, millions of dollars were spent preparing the runways and taxiways for the next generation of bombers and tankers, namely the B-52 and KC-135. The 40th Bomb Wing was reassigned to Fifteenth Air Force along with the 802d AD on 1 January 1959. With Schilling under construction, the wing was reassigned to Forbes AFB, Kansas on 20 June 1960 and the Second Air Force, 21st Air Division.

In the early 1960s, the B-47 was considered to be reaching obsolescence, and was being phased out of SAC's strategic arsenal. At Forbes, the 40th Bomb Wing gained an Atlas missile squadron in January 1964, and was redesignated the 40th Strategic Aerospace Wing on 1 February 1964. Began phasing down for inactivation with the retirement of its B-47s during the spring of 1964 and was designated as non-operational from 15 August, to 1 September 1964.

The wing was discontinued and inactivated on 1 September 1964.

United States Air Forces in Europe 

On 1 April 1966, the 40th Tactical Group was activated at Aviano AB, Italy, and replaced the 7227th Combat Support Group to handle the Tactical Air Command rotational units from the United States deploying a permanent basis. The redesignation was part of the USAFE takeover of the base and its support functions. On 30 July 1990, the USAF redesignated the MAJCOM group the AFCON 40th Tactical Support Wing and formally consolidated the unit with the historical 40th Bombardment Wing and 40th Bombardment Group which gave the host unit at Aviano a unit with a combat lineage.

With the closure of USAF operations at Torrejon AB, Spain on 4 May 1992, the 401st Tactical Fighter Wing moved to Aviano AB without personnel or equipment and administratively replaced the 40th TSW, which inactivated the same day.

Wars in Afghanistan and Iraq 
The wing was reactivated after January 2002 as an Air Expeditionary Wing to bomb targets and provide aerial refueling during the United States invasion of Afghanistan. 

Years afterwards, in 2007, Globalsecurity.org listed its flying units as including the 9th Expeditionary Air Refueling Squadron; the 28th Expeditionary Air Refueling Squadron; the 40th Expeditionary Bomb Squadron; wing support organizations included the 40th Expeditionary Logistics Group; and also reported that it parented the 60th Air Expeditionary Group; the 321st Air Expeditionary Group, for a time located at Jacobabad in Pakistan, and the 462d Air Expeditionary Group.

It is known that the 40 AEW B-52 Stratofortresses dropped about 58 percent of the munitions used during Operation Anaconda and had flown more than 80 sorties; releasing more than 2,000 bombs supporting Operation Enduring Freedom.

It is not known when the wing was inactivated or if it is still operational. However, it is known that bomber operations from Diego Garcia concluded on 15 August 2006.

Lineage, assignments, components, stations

Lineage
40th Air Expeditionary Wing
 Constituted as the 40th Bombardment Group (Medium) on 22 November 1940
 Activated on 1 April 1941
 Redesignated 40th Bombardment Group (Heavy) on 25 May 1942.
 Redesignated 40th Bombardment Group, Very Heavy on 20 November 1943.
 Inactivated on 1 October 1946
 Redesignated as 40th Tactical Group and activated on 14 March 1966 (not organized)
 Organized on 1 April 1966
 Consolidated on 31 January 1984 with the 40th Strategic Aerospace Wing
 Redesignated 40th Tactical Support Wing on 30 July 1990
 Inactivated on 4 May 1992.
 Redesignated 40th Air Expeditionary Wing, and converted to provisional status on 31 January 2002

40th Strategic Aerospace Wing
 Constituted as the 40th Bombardment Wing, Medium, on 9 May 1952
 Activated on 28 May 1952.
 Redesignated 40th Strategic Aerospace Wing on 1 February 1964
 Discontinued and inactivated, on 1 September 1964.
 Consolidated on 31 January 1984 with the 40th Tactical Group as the 40th Tactical Group

Assignments

 Panama Canal Air Force, 1 April 1940
 13 Composite Wing,1 May 1941
 VI Bomber Command, 25 October 1941
 Sixth Air Force, 13 June – 1 July 1943
 Second Air Force
 II Bomber Command, 1 July 1943
 Second Air Force, 6 October 1943
 Twentieth Air Force
 XX Bomber Command
 58th Bombardment Wing, 19 November 1943
 XX Bomber Command, 1 October – 7 November 1945
 Continental Air Forces
 Fourth Air Force, 27 November 1945 – 8 May 1946

 Strategic Air Command, 21 March – 1 October 1946; 25 May 1952
 Fifteenth Air Force
 802d Air Division, 28 May 1952
 Attached to: 310th Bombardment Wing, Medium, 6 February – 1 May 1953
 Attached to:  7th Air Division, 9 June – 9 September 1955
 Eighth Air Force
 802d Air Division, 1 July 1955
 Attached to: 7th Air Division, 1 July, – 1 October 1957
 Fifteenth Air Force
 802d Air Division, 1 January 1959
 Second Air Force
 21st Air Division, June 120, 1960 – 1 September 1964
 United States Air Forces in Europe, 1 April 1966 – 4 May 1992
 United States Central Command Air Forces, 2001–TBD

Bases stationed

 Borinquen Field, Puerto Rico, 1 April 1941
 Howard Field, Canal Zone, 16 June 1942
 Albrook Field, Canal Zone, 16 September 1942
 Howard Field, Canal Zone, 3–15 June 1943
 Pratt AAF, Kansas, 1 July 1943 – 12 March 1944
 Chakulia AB, India, 2 April 1944 – 25 February 1945
 Hsinching Airfield (A-1), China designated as forward staging base.

 West Field, Tinian, Mariana Islands, 4 April – 7 November 1945
 March Field, California, 27 November 1945
 Davis–Monthan Field, Arizona, 8 May – 1 October 1946
 Smoky Hill (later, Schilling) AFB, Kansas, 28 May 1952
 Forbes AFB, Kansas, 20 June 1960 – 1 September 1964
Diego Garcia, Indian Ocean (since 2001)

Components

Second World War 
 25th Bombardment Squadron: 12 May 1943 – 1 October 1946; 28 May 1952 – 1 September 1964 (not operational, 28 May 1952 – c. 3 April 1953 and 15 August – 1 September 1964)
 29th Bombardment Squadron: 1 April 1941 – 12 May 1943
 44th Bombardment Squadron: 1 April 1941 – 1 October 1946; 28 May 1952 – 1 September 1964 (not operational, 28 May 1952 – 31 May 1953 and 15 August-1 September 1964)
 45th Bombardment Squadron: 1 April 1941 – 1 October 1946; 28 May 1952 – 1 September 1964 (not operational, 28 May 1952 – 30 September 1953 and 15 August-1 September 1964)
 74th Bombardment Squadron: 9 August 1942 – 12 May 1943
 343d Bombardment Squadron: 10 November 1945 – 27 March 1946
 345th Bombardment Squadron: 10 November 1945 – 27 March 1946
 5th Reconnaissance Squadron (Medium) (later 395th Bombardment Squadron): 25 February-9 August 1942; 12 May 1943 – 20 October 1944
 1st Bombardment Maintenance Squadron
 2d Bombardment Maintenance Squadron
 3d Bombardment Maintenance Squadron
 4th Bombardment Maintenance Squadron
 11th Photographic Laboratory Squadron

United States Air Force
 40th Air Refueling Squadron: 8 July 1952 – 1 June 1960 (not operational, 8 July-7 September 1952; detached 8 September 1952 – 30 April 1953, 1–10 March 1954, 4 May – 27 June 1954, 25 June-5 September 1956, c. 1 July—c. 1 October 1957, c. 1 October 1958 – 10 January 1959)
 90th Air Refueling Squadron: 20 June 1960 – 15 November 1962
 548th Strategic Missile Squadron: 1 January-1 September 1964 (detached 1 August-1 September 1964)
 660th Bombardment Squadron: 1 February 1959 – 1 January 1962.

Aircraft and missiles operated

United States Army Air Forces
 Douglas B-18 Bolo
 Boeing B-17 Flying Fortress
 Boeing B-29 Superfortress
 Martin B-26 Marauder

United States Air Force
 Boeing KC-135 Stratotanker
 Boeing B-47 Stratojet
 Convair SM-65 Atlas-E Missile
 Rockwell International B-1 Lancer
 Boeing B-52 Stratofortress

See also
 List of B-29 Superfortress operators

Notes

References

 
 Endicott, Judy G. (1999) Active Air Force wings as of 1 October 1995; USAF active flying, space, and missile squadrons as of 1 October 1995. Maxwell AFB, Alabama: Office of Air Force History. CD-ROM.
 Maurer, Maurer (1983). Air Force Combat Units of World War II. Maxwell AFB, Alabama: Office of Air Force History. .
 Ravenstein, Charles A. (1984). Air Force Combat Wings Lineage and Honors Histories 1947–1977. Maxwell AFB, Alabama: Office of Air Force History. .
 Rogers, Brian (2005). United States Air Force Unit Designations Since 1978. Hinkley, England: Midland Publications. .

External links
 40th Bomb Wing Association

0040
Military units and formations established in 2002
Military units and formations disestablished in 2006